Louise Wiker (born 1 January 1979) is a Swedish long-distance runner. She competed in the marathon event at the 2015 World Championships in Athletics in Beijing, China.

References

External links

1979 births
Living people
Swedish female long-distance runners
Swedish female marathon runners
World Athletics Championships athletes for Sweden
Place of birth missing (living people)